Chandler Wade Brewer (born June 12, 1997) is an American football guard who is a free agent. He played college football at Middle Tennessee.

College career
Brewer was a member of the Middle Tennessee Blue Raiders for four seasons, playing in 52 games. As a senior, he started all 14 of Middle Tennessee's games and was named first-team All-Conference USA. Following the end of the season, he announced that he had been diagnosed with non-Hodgkin lymphoma during the summer going into his senior year and had to undergo radiation treatment in-between games.

Professional career

Brewer signed with the Los Angeles Rams as an undrafted free agent on April 27, 2019. Brewer was waived at the end of training camp during final roster cuts, but was re-signed by the Rams to their practice squad on September 1, 2019. Brewer was promoted to the Rams active roster on November 13, 2019. Brewer made his NFL debut on November 17, 2019 against the Chicago Bears. Brewer played in seven games during his rookie season.

Brewer exercised his option to opt-out of the 2020 season due to the COVID-19 pandemic on July 31, 2020.

On August 31, 2021, Brewer was waived by the Rams and re-signed to the practice squad the next day. Brewer won his first Super Bowl ring when the Rams defeated the Cincinnati Bengals in Super Bowl LVI. 

On February 15, 2022, Brewer signed a reserve/future contract with the Rams. He was waived on August 30, 2022 and signed to the practice squad the next day. He was elevated to the active roster on October 3, 2022, via a standard elevation which caused him to revert back to the practice squad after the game. He was promoted to the active roster on November 5, 2022. He was placed on injured reserve eleven days later. He was activated on December 31, 2022.

References

External links
Middle Tennessee State Blue Raiders bio
Los Angeles Rams bio

1997 births
Living people
American football offensive linemen
Los Angeles Rams players
Players of American football from Alabama
Middle Tennessee Blue Raiders football players
Sportspeople from Florence, Alabama